The following is the qualification system and qualified athletes for the karate at the 2019 Pan American Games competitions.

Qualification system
A total of 132 karatekas will qualify to compete. There will be eight athletes qualified in each individual event, along with six teams in the kata team events. Each nation may enter a maximum of 18 athletes (nine per gender). This consists of a maximum of one athlete in the individual events (12), and one group of three in each kata team event (six). The host nation, Peru, automatically qualifies the maximum number of athletes (18). The rest of the spots will be awarded across four qualification tournaments.

Venezuela, Panama and Colombia's athletes will be eligible to qualify through the 2018 Central American and Caribbean Games, while Mexico will qualify through the North American Cup.

Three athletes will make up each team kata entry.

Qualification timeline

Qualification summary
The following is a list of qualified countries and athletes per event.

Men

Individual kata

Argentina declined its quota, which was reallocated to Ecuador.

Team kata

-60 kg

-67 kg

Jolano Lindelauf qualified under the Curacao flag. Since the nation is not a member of Panamsports, Lindelauf will compete for Aruba.

-75 kg

-84 kg

+84 kg

Women

Individual kata

Team kata

-50 kg

-55 kg

-61 kg

-68 kg

+68 kg

References

P
P
Qualification for the 2019 Pan American Games
Karate at the 2019 Pan American Games